Granby station is a train station in Granby, Colorado. It is served by Amtrak's California Zephyr, which runs once daily between Chicago and Emeryville, California, in the San Francisco Bay Area. Despite its antiquated appearance and structure (the station is made of wood), the station was built in 1987.

Granby is proposed as a station to use for access of the Rocky Mountain National Park by train.

Notes

References

External links 

Granby Amtrak Station (USA RailGuide - TrainWeb)

Amtrak stations in Colorado
Stations along Denver and Rio Grande Western Railroad lines
Transportation buildings and structures in Grand County, Colorado
Railway stations in the United States opened in 1987